Joan Claudi Peiròt (in French Jean-Claude Peyrot, September 3, 1709 – April 3, 1795) was an Occitan-language writer from Millau in the province of Rouergue.

Bibliography 
Poésies diverses, patoises et françaises. 1774.
Les quatre Saisons. Villefranche-de-Rouergue, 1781
Œuvres diverses. Villefranche-sur-Rouergue, 1788.
Œuvres patoises et françaises, 3e édition, Millau, 1810.
Œuvres patoises complètes, 4e édition, Millau, 1823.
Œuvres patoises complètes, 5e édition, Millau, 1855.
Œuvres patoises complètes, Millau, 1886.
Les Quatre Saisons, Rodez, 1906.
Poésies Rouergates & Françaises, Millau, 1909.

External links 
 Peyrot's work on Google books
 Las sasons a French translation Google books

Occitan-language Occitan writers
People from Millau
1709 births
1795 deaths